The Mayor of Nairobi was the non-executive head of Nairobi City Council in Nairobi, Kenya until the new constitution of 2010 which devolved government was enacted. The Mayor's office, officially the Mayor’s Palour, was located at City Hall Nairobi. The last mayor of Nairobi was George Aladwa of ODM, elected on 10 August 2011.

There was no Mayor of Nairobi from 1983 to 1992 because the City Council of Nairobi was replaced by the City Commission appointed by then president Daniel Toroitich Arap Moi. The City Council was restored after the multi-party elections of 1992. In the year 2013 the office of mayor ceased to exist since under the Constitution of Kenya, 2010 local governments were replaced by county governments.

The following is a list of the mayors of Nairobi from the time the city was a colonial town.

See also
 Timeline of Nairobi

Sources

References 

1. 

2. 

3. Norman Harris: From trusteeship to development: how class and gender complicated Kenya's housing policy, 1939–1963
  
4. Lady Gwladys (Gladys) Delamere: 

  Lady Gwladys (Gladys) Delamere 

5. 
 
6. 

7. 

 

8. 

Nairobi
Mayors of Nairobi